The Research Institute for Cereals and Industrial Crops (INCDA, Institutul de Cercetări pentru Cereale și Plante Tehnice Fundulea) is a government research institute in Fundulea, Romania. It was founded in 1962 as a branch of the Agronomical Research Institute (ICAR, 1927) in Bucharest.

References

External links
Website

Educational institutions established in 1962
Agricultural research institutes
Research institutes in Romania
Agricultural organizations based in Romania
Călărași County
1962 establishments in Romania